A Transit of Venus occurs when the planet Venus passes between the Sun and the Earth, as it happened in:
Transit of Venus, 1639
Transit of Venus, 1761
Transit of Venus, 1769
Transit of Venus, 1874
Transit of Venus, 1882
Transit of Venus, 2004
Transit of Venus, 2012

Transit of Venus may also refer to:

 Transit of Venus March, an 1883 march by John Philip Sousa
 Transit of Venus (play), a 1992 play by Maureen Hunter
 Transit of Venus (opera), a 2007 operatic adaptation of the 1992 play
 The Transit of Venus  (Doctor Who audio), a 2009 audiobook based on the  television series Doctor Who
 Transit of Venus (album), the 2012 album from Canadian rock band Three Days Grace
 The Transit of Venus, a 1980 book by Shirley Hazzard
 Transit of Venus: Travels in the Pacific, a 1992 book by Julian Evans

See also
Astrological transit